The Air Creation Twin is a French ultralight trike that was designed and produced by Air Creation of Aubenas. Production has been completed, but while the aircraft was available it was supplied as an assembly kit for amateur construction or as a complete ready-to-fly-aircraft.

Design and development
The Twin was designed as a trainer for the Air Creation Fun Racer. It features a cable-braced hang glider-style high-wing, weight-shift controls, a two-seats-in-tandem open cockpit without a cockpit fairing, tricycle landing gear with wheel pants and a single engine in pusher configuration.

The aircraft is made from bolted-together aluminum tubing, with its Air Creation Fun 450 single surface wing covered in Trilam Dacron sailcloth, with a Mylar leading edge. The powerplant is a twin cylinder, air-cooled, two-stroke, dual-ignition  Rotax 503 engine.

The manufacturer estimates the construction time from the supplied kit as 40 hours.

Specifications (Twin with Fun 450 wing)

References

External links
Photo of an Air Creation Twin with XP wing fitted

1990s French sport aircraft
1990s French ultralight aircraft
Single-engined pusher aircraft
Ultralight trikes
Homebuilt aircraft
High-wing aircraft
Twin